In molecular biology, this protein domain is found at the C terminus of the GTP-binding protein, YchF-GTPase found in both prokaryotes and eukaryotes.

Function
The function of this protein domain remains unknown, however, it is putatively thought to be necessary for ribosome function or for signal transduction from the ribosome to downstream targets. Additionally, GTPases are often described as a molecular switch.

Structure

The crystal structure of Haemophilus influenzae has been determined. This protein consists of three domains, of which the C-terminal domain which is composed of a six-stranded half-barrel curved around an alpha helix.

References

Protein domains